Freestone or free stone may refer to:

Places

Australia 
 Freestone, Queensland, a locality in the Southern Downs Region

United States 
 Freestone, California, United States
 Freestone, Texas, an unincorporated community
 Freestone County, Texas

People with the surname
 Chris Freestone (born 1971), retired English football forward
 Roger Freestone (born 1968), Welsh footballer

Other uses 
 Freestone (masonry)
 A type or part of drupe, a fruit
 Freestone peach, a type of peach (fruit)
 Freestone stream, a stream that flows seasonally
 , a Haskell-class attack transport